Trio for two Oboes and English Horn in C major, Op. 87 is a trio composition by Ludwig van Beethoven written in 1794, shortly after he arrived Vienna.

Structure 
This trio consists of 4 movements:
1. Allegro (C major)
2. Adagio (F major)
3. Minuet. Allegro molto. Scherzo - Trio (C major)
4. Finale. Presto (C major)

External Links 
Arrangement for two violins and viola, published by G. Henle Verlag.

References 

Chamber music by Ludwig van Beethoven
1794 compositions
Compositions for English horn
Compositions for oboe